Ojo de Agua is the largest colonia in the municipality of Tecámac in State of Mexico, Mexico.  It is located in the northeastern part of the state, northeast of Mexico City and within the Greater Mexico City urban area. It had a 2010 census population of 242,272 inhabitants, or 66.45 percent of its municipality's total of 364,579. Ojo de Agua is the largest locality in Mexico that is not a municipal seat. (The municipal seat lies in the town of Tecámac de Felipe Villanueva, with a population of 15,911 inhabitants.) Ojo de Agua lies at an elevation of 2,248 m (7,375 ft.) above sea level.

References
2010 census tables: INEGI: Instituto Nacional de Estadística, Geografía e Informática

External links
Ayuntamiento de Tecámac Official website of Municipality of Tecámac

Populated places in the State of Mexico
Tecámac